Ascot Racecourse is a former racecourse in the southern Sydney suburb of Mascot, close to the Mascot Aerodrome. It was named after Royal Ascot Racecourse in the United Kingdom. It is now part of the site of Sydney Airport. It operated from 1904 to 1941, and was one of four racecourses in Sydney where unregistered proprietary horse racing took place.

Large crowds were moved to and from the racecourse by a dedicated tramline from Botany Road. The first aeroplane flight over Sydney was made from Ascot Racecourse on 5 May 1911, by J.J. Hammond in his Boxkite plane. The racecourse closed during World War II when it was used as a military camp. It did not reopen after the war, and was demolished as part of expansion works for Sydney Airport. The only surviving physical evidence of the racecourse are fifteen fig trees which formerly lined the racecourse entrance. These trees are located near the airport's long-term carpark, and are the subject of heritage preservation.

See also
 Ascot Racecourse, Western Australia

References

Sports venues in Sydney
Former buildings and structures in Sydney
1904 establishments in Australia
1941 disestablishments in Australia
Sports venues completed in 1904